Dalla eryonas is a species of butterfly in the family Hesperiidae. It is found from Panama to Brazil.

References

Butterflies described in 1877
eryonas
Hesperiidae of South America
Taxa named by William Chapman Hewitson